Serfoji III also spelt as Sarabhoji III Bhonsle, was an adopted son of the last Maratha ruler of Thanjavur, Shivaji and pretender to the throne of Thanjavur. 

When Shivaji II died in 1855, in the absence of a natural male heir, the Thanjavur Maratha kingdom was annexed by the British East India Company as per the Doctrine of Lapse. While Vijaya Mohana Muktamba Bai, Shivaji II's eldest surviving naturally-born daughter was given titular and customary privileges, the government refused to accord the same privileges to Serfoji III.

References 

People of the Thanjavur Maratha kingdom